Nikolai Alexandrovich Knyzhov (born 20 March 1998) is a Russian professional ice hockey defenceman for the  San Jose Sharks of the National Hockey League (NHL).

Playing career
Knyzhov first played as a youth in his native Russia with hometown club, Energia Kemerovo, before moving to North America to play amateur junior hockey in Phoenix, Arizona with the Phoenix Firebirds and Jr. Coyotes. He was selected 41st overall in the 2015 CHL Import Draft by the Regina Pats of the Western Hockey League (WHL).

He joined the Pats in the 2015–16 season, registering just 1 assist in 19 games, before leaving the team and opting to return the United States, playing with the Springfield Jr. Blues and Austin Bruins in the North American Hockey League (NAHL).

During the 2016–17 season, Knyzhov left the Bruins to return to his native Russia, agreeing to play within the SKA Saint Petersburg junior program. In the 2017–18 season, Knyzhov made his professional debut with SKA-Neva in the Supreme Hockey League. He appeared in 33 games from the blueline, adding 2 goals and 6 points in the second tiered VHL.

Continuing with SKA-Neva in the 2018–19 season, Knyzhov as a defensive defenseman appeared in 46 games with 5 points. He was recalled by SKA Saint Petersburg and made his Kontinental Hockey League debut, in a 7–1 victory over Dinamo Riga on 26 January 2019. He was returned to SKA-Neva after three scoreless games, and made 11 playoff appearances.

On 2 July 2019, Knyzhov returned to North America after he was signed by the San Jose Sharks to a three-year, entry-level contract. After attending his first training camp with the Sharks, Knyzhov was assigned to begin the 2019–20 season with AHL affiliate, the San Jose Barracuda. After 33 games with the Barracuda, showing a sound defensive game, Knyzhov was recalled by the injury-hit Sharks on 7 March 2020. He made his NHL debut that night in a 2–1 overtime loss to the Ottawa Senators. He recorded his first NHL point, in a 4–3 shootout win over the Los Angeles Kings, assisting the second goal. Knyzhov scored his first NHL goal on 31 March 2021 against the Minnesota Wild. Despite not playing in 2021–22 due to an injury, he signed a one-year contract extension on 1 April 2022. He tore his achilles in the 2022 off-season.

Career statistics

Regular season and playoffs

International

References

External links

1998 births
Living people
Expatriate ice hockey players in Canada
Expatriate ice hockey players in the United States
People from Kemerovo
Regina Pats players
Russian expatriate ice hockey people
Russian expatriate sportspeople in Canada
Russian expatriate sportspeople in the United States
Russian ice hockey defencemen
San Jose Barracuda players
San Jose Sharks players
SKA-Neva players
SKA Saint Petersburg players
Undrafted National Hockey League players